RichGirl was an American R&B vocal girl group consisting of four members: Audra Simmons, Christina "Brave" Williams, Kristal Lyndriette Smith (then known as Lyndriette and now known as Kristal, a member of June's Diary) and Amber Streeter (now known as Sevyn Streeter). The group's name refers to "a certain attitude and confidence, combined with individuality and talent that any girl might possess", rather than material items. The group was formed with the help of record producer Rich Harrison, his respective record label Richcraft Entertainment, and was managed by Tina Davis. The group drew inspiration from groups such as Destiny's Child, Spice Girls, SWV, En Vogue, TLC, and artists such as Beyoncé, Toni Braxton, Madonna, Stevie Wonder, Angie Stone, and Michael Jackson.

Although the group never released a full debut LP, work on a self-titled debut album had begun in 2009 with a planned release in 2010 and 2011. The album saw the release of a promotional single titled "24" featuring Bun B. and two official singles, "He Ain't wit Me Now (Tho)" and "Swagger Right". Following unsuccessful attempts to chart, the girls released their one and only full album release on Valentine's Day 2011 with a mixtape Fall in Love with RichGirl. The group later unofficially disbanded after all members of the group pursued solo careers and different endeavors.

Music career

2007–2008: Early beginnings
RichGirl was formed with the help of Rich Harrison, and signed to his label Richcraft, and Jive Records in 2007. Lyndriette was signed to a production company at the age of 15 when she first met Harrison.  They kept in contact, and when Harrison decided to start the group, he immediately offered her a spot, "He knew me so by the time the idea came to him, he had me in mind and offered me the position". Christina "Brave" Williams met Harrison at the age of 16, and as signed to his label as a solo artist. Williams left after a year due to creative differences; now with 3 years of development and hard work under her belt, Brave, now savvy and more experienced, is reintroduced to Harrison calling the shots. Brave presented to Harrison an idea he couldn't refuse - a girl group. After carefully handpicking each member, Brave created the name and the creed for a group the world would later known as RichGirl. Amber "Sevyn" Streeter signed a deal with Interscope when she was 15 as a member of the Chris Stokes girl group, TG4. The group released an EP called Virginity -EP in 2002 and disbanded before they could release their first LP Time for the New. Streeter was later discovered by Harrison on MySpace, and signed onto the RichCraft label as Se7en. Audra Simmons relocated to Los Angeles to launch a solo career and joined the group through an open audition. Audra said that she was "waiting tables by day and singing at night, that's when I found out about Richgirl ... I was the only girl they found through the actual auditioning process". Once RichGirl was formed, the members began living together in Atlanta.

2009–2010: RichGirl and EP
RichGirl began to work on their self-titled debut album in 2009, due for release early 2010. Sevyn described the album as "motivational, empowering, fun, and honest". The girls wrote several songs on the album and did their own vocal arrangements, although Lyndriette said they "didn't get an opportunity to write as much as we all liked only because it was a little rushed, and the label was pushing us to get it done". In addition to Harrison, the group has recorded with Bryan-Michael Cox, and production duos The Underdogs, Dre & Vidal, and "KP" and Malay. As they continued work on their debut album, the girls performed at the annual Teen Takeover event in May 2009, alongside Keri Hilson and Yung L.A. RichGirl was an opening act for Beyoncé on her I Am ... Tour, for the North American Leg beginning on June 21, 2009 in New York. The group performed a 15-minute set, which included their single, "He Ain't wit Me Now (Tho)", snippets from their debut album and a cover of "Over the Rainbow".

RichGirl saw their first official release with the promotional-single, "24's" featuring Bun B on February 5, 2009. The song managed to peak at number eighty-three on Billboard's Hot R&B/Hip-Hop Songs chart in 2009. The group released their official debut single, "He Ain't wit Me Now (Tho)" on June 2, 2009. The song features production from the group's founder Rich Harrison, and was accompanied with a music video directed by Ray Kay. The song debuted on the Billboard Hot R&B/Hip-Hop Songs at number ninety-six on the week of August 8, 2009. The album's next single was confirmed to be "Swagger Right", featuring Fabolous and Rick Ross released on September 27, 2010. A music video for the single was shot and released by Colin Tilley. The song peaked at number seventy-two on the Billboard Hot R&B/Hip-Hop Songs on its second week after premiere and later fell off the charts.

On September 9, 2009, RichGirl released a free EP through their official website. The EP included the group's lead single "He Ain't wit Me Now (Tho)" and promotional single "24's," along with snippets of tracks from their then upcoming album including "Back 2 tha Club", "Millionaire", and the demo of the second single "Swagger Right", tentatively titled "Get Ya Swagga Right".

2011–2012: Fall in Love with RichGirl and disbandment
The girls' mixtape Fall in Love with RichGirl was released on Valentine's Day 2011 and was made available for free download on their official site. On October 7, 2011, RCA Music Group announced it was disbanding Jive Records along with Arista Records and J Records.  With the shutdown, the girls (and all other artists previously signed to these three labels) would release their future material (including their self-titled debut album) on the RCA Records brand.

Following poor commercial success from official releases, speculation arose as the members of the group began to release music individually and follow different endeavors. In October 2011, it was confirmed that RichGirl member Lyndriette had been enrolled in Robin Antin's revised edition of the Pussycat Dolls. Antin later revealed that the new line-up for the recording group had not been officially chosen, only to later confirm through the group's official Super Bowl XLVI commercial that Lyndriette was not officially chosen in the group's final line-up. On December 1, 2011, Lyndritte released a solo EP entitled Proclamation which featured the lead single "Addicted".  On March 21, 2012, Se7en released a song titled "Red Handed" along with a statement that confirmed her disbandment from the group and revealed that she had signed with Chris Brown's CBE imprint.

2013–present: Aftermath
Following the release of Chris Brown's Fortune (2012), Se7en has been featured on the album as Sevyn (removing the number "7", and adding a "v" and "y" instead). Se7en changed her stage name to Sevyn Streeter. On October 30, 2012, she released her debut single "I Like It", and premiered the music video for the song on BET's 106 & Park on January 4, 2013 in Los Angeles, and on May 22, 2013, she released her second single "It Won't Stop". On April 24, 2012, Brave launched her official website, confirming in her biography her absence from the group, and the group's separation as a whole. She plans to release her solo EP, A Brave New World. On June 19, 2013 Lyndriette signed to Tyrese Gibson's Voltron Recordz, and is currently a member of the girl group June's Diary as Kristal. On November 6, 2013 at 1:11PM V 103 Atlanta premiered her debut single "Silhouette" produced by B.A.M. and written by Adonis, Kenyon Dixon and herself. Audra is currently in the studio working with heavy hitter producers and should have an EP out late 2014.

Artistry

Music and voice

RichGirl's music is generally R&B, but also incorporates hip hop and pop. Known for their "powerful pipes," and strongest as a quartet, the group would cover songs such as Bruno Mars's "Grenade" and Lloyd's "Lay It Down" with ease, attempting vocals that promise to "turn their man out." Specializing in mid-tempo tunes, the girls would constantly stay on rotation, taking turns singing into a song's melody and verse, only to later harmonize over a song's chorus. When attempting signature savvy songs, the group members would join together on "seamless harmonies." While commenting on their opulent voices, Rap-Up described the group's sound as being blessed with "golden pipes."

"Our sound is very honest. Each song tells a specific story. One thing that we want to do is bring the singing back to the songs... That's something that's lacking right now... If there was a cross between En Vogue and certain elements of the Spice Girls, that's what we'd like to bring. The individuality, but yet a whole.
—RichGirl to Rap-Up about their vocal and fashion styling.

While reviewing the group's debut singles, Felipe Delerme of FADER showed great praise for the group's music and voice. Praising the group, Delerme showed great appreciation for RichGirl for bring back the glory days of "Glam&B," "when we sipped Hpnotiq and danced on couches with no regard for the world's impending financial crisis." Noting the group as a "multi-culti foursome," Delerme noted that the success of the group could mean a return to a simpler time in music. Critics described the group as a "Voltron of sorts," noting that each member is as individually talented as the girl to their right and left."

Songwriting and image

The group's name, RichGirl, refers to "a certain attitude and confidence, combined with individuality and talent that any girl might possess", rather than material items. Brave says that their sound is "very honest", and "each song tells a specific story". The group wants to "bring the singing back to the songs", which they feel is lacking in the music industry. The singers describe themselves as a cross between En Vogue and the Spice Girls, citing the individuality, but still being a whole. RichGirl is inspired by the looks, sophistication and classiness of En Vogue. When first being reviewed by SESAC, Dan Kimpel described their image as "high-gloss." Being part of a group, the girls would introduce themselves with words that would describe their personalities and uprisings; the spoken-word poet Brave, the Southern belle Lyndriette, church-raised Se7en, and the sassy Audra. To accompany their personalities, their clothing styles differ among the group with Brave striking similarities to a Sarah Jessica Parker fashionista, Lyndriette fashioned under a tailored look, Se7en comfortably styled in boho or short, tight, and sexy styles, and Audra rocking mod fashions.

While working on their debut album, RichGirl was accompanied by different writers to work with including The Underdogs, Dre and Vidal, and Bryan-Michael Cox. When asked about their part in writing music for their album, members Lyndirette and Audra where quoted saying "We're very hands on when it comes to the songwriting. It's cool to meet different songwriters and see how it all works. Even if we're not sitting there writing, we are a part of the writing process because we've thrown the idea out there in terms of what we want to sing about or know about." On working with SESAC-award-winning Bryan-Michael Cox, member Brave stated, "With Bryan-Michael Cox in particular, and a lot of the other songwriters, we're very involved creatively. Working with Rich, since he knows us so well, maybe we'll inspire him with a new topic, or a more clever way of saying, 'We're going to the club.'" RichGirl takes advantage of the fact that there are four members, allowing their music to create emotional connections through songwriting with a combination of the four women's personal experiences, as Se7en states, "Because there are four of us, we have four different stories. But even if I haven't experienced a certain scenario, it might be something in Lyndriette's past; or maybe we have a sister who has the same story. So as long as we truly relate to the song, it's important for these messages to get out because we can relate as women."

Members Brave and Lyndriette created alter-ego's for themselves, and introduced them on their personal YouTube channel on September 9, 2009. Brave created her alter-ego known as Kiki Bravery Hennessey and Lyndriette created Boom-Shika. Although the alter-ego's have never made a musical debut, in an interview with Billboard Brave revealed that Kiki Bravery created an extended remix to their promotional single "24's" with an extra rapped verse. To promote the group's second single, "Swagger Right", the group released webisodes titled "The Swagger Series," featuring Lyndirette's alter-ego, Boomshika, in episode six.

Discography

Official mixtapes

Extended plays

Singles

Promotional singles

Music videos

Other appearances

Unreleased songs

Tours
Opening act
2009: I Am... World Tour (Beyoncé)
2009: BK Family Live Tour (Mario)

Notes

References

External links
 RichGirl official site
 RichGirl official VEVO account

African-American girl groups
American rhythm and blues musical groups
Jive Records artists
Musical groups disestablished in 2011
Musical groups established in 2007
Musical groups from Atlanta
RCA Records artists